Bharat Veer (born 2 February 1988) is an Indian former cricketer. He played one Twenty20 cricket match for Delhi in 2010.

See also
 List of Delhi cricketers

References

External links
 

1988 births
Living people
Indian cricketers
Delhi cricketers
Cricketers from Delhi